GBG is an identity verification, location intelligence and fraud prevention company.  GBG offers software and data that help organizations validate and verify the identity and location of their customers. GBG products are built on data obtained from over 200 global partners. GBG focuses on innovative technology for location intelligence, fraud detection and identity verification.  GBG can verify the identity of 4.4 billion people globally.

History
GBG was established in 1989 initially as GB Mailing Systems, to exploit the market for postcode and address information. In addition to software products, GB Mailing Systems also provided bureau services relating to postcodes, names, addresses and other information. In the late 1990s the company changed its name to GB Information Management and in July 1999, was acquired by Phonelink, a company founded by Trevor Burke.  At the time of acquisition, GB Information Management had a turnover of 6.9 million GBP, an operating profit of 1 million GBP and employed approximately 80 people in Chester, United Kingdom.

On 1 April 2000, the company changed its name from Phonelink plc to TelMe.com plc in response to the success of their early Tel-Me application. In February 2004, the company changed its name to GB Group as part of a movement to distinguish itself from its previous travel interests. In 2006 the company launched an international identity verification service covering 21 countries. In 2011 GB Group moved to a listing on the London Stock Exchange Alternative Investment Market. In 2015 GB Group re-branded to "GBG" for ease of international recognition.  This reflected a desire to pursue international growth.  In 2019 GBG international revenues increased to represent 57% of revenues from 35%.

Company Name
"GB Group Plc" is a public company listed on the London Stock Exchange, Alternative Investment Market.  "GB Group Plc" is the official registered name with Companies House in the United Kingdom.  The "GB" in GB Group is often thought to stand for "Great Britain," but in fact originates from the last name of two founding directors: Alexander Green and Trevor Burke.  GBG is the global brand name.

Customers
GBG works with 20,000 clients in 79 countries, ranging from US e-commerce giants, to banks in Asia, and European household brands. GBG supports smaller businesses and disruptive start-ups as well. Many use GBG's products to help make their businesses more efficient.

Employees
GBG has 1,200 employees across 20 countries and measures its performance by Q12 Gallup Polling employee engagement. GBG has an employee engagement score of 81 percent and Glassdoor rating of 4.3.

Acquisitions and Divestitures

The rationale for GBG's acquisition strategy is that it can be a more efficient way to gain access to new clients, datasets, and capabilities and, to expand into new markets.  The earnings impact of the acquisitions, the new datasets, customers and expanded geographical presence are key drivers of GBG's growth.

In 2015, GBG acquired Loqate, a specialist in global addressing technology.  Loqate provided GBG with a base in Silicon Valley for US-focused operations.  GBG had previously held an investment stake of 26% in Loqate.  The acquisition valued Loqate at 20 million USD.

In 2016, GBG acquired IDscan Biometrics Ltd, a provider of software that authenticates documents including passports, visas, ID cards, driving licenses, utility bills and work permits.  IDscan also provides facial recognition software to check that those documents are not stolen.  GBG paid 60 million USD.

In 2017, GBG acquired PCA Predict, a leading provider of UK and international address validation services for 100 million USD.

In 2018, GBG acquired Verifeyed, a Czech company focused on detecting whether an image has been digitally tampered with.  Transaction details were not disclosed.

In 2018, GBG also acquired Vix Verify, an Australian company focused on identity verification and address validation for 38 million USD.

In 2019, GBG acquired IDology, a US identity verification company for 300 million USD.

In 2020, GBG invested 7m USD in CredoLab, a Singapore headquartered credit scoring company.

In 2020, GBG acquired HooYu Investigate, a UK identity verification vendor for 5 million USD.

In 2021, GBG sold its Marketing Services division, representing 2% of Group revenues for an undisclosed amount.

In 2021, GBG acquired Acuant, a US identity verification and identity fraud prevention company for 736 million USD.

References

Companies based in Chester
Companies listed on the Alternative Investment Market